The EAR 12 class was a class of  gauge  steam locomotives built by W. G. Bagnall in  Stafford, England, in 1950.  The class had been ordered by the Tanganyika Railway (TR) as its SS class, and was a modified and updated version of the TR's existing ST class.

By the time the two members of the class were built and entered service, the TR had been succeeded by the East African Railways (EAR), which designated them as its 12 class, and put them to work in the Tanganyika Territory (now part of Tanzania).

See also
History of rail transport in Tanzania

References

Notes

Bibliography

External links

Bagnall locomotives
East African Railways locomotives
Metre gauge steam locomotives
Railway locomotives introduced in 1950
Steam locomotives of Tanzania
2-6-2T locomotives
Scrapped locomotives